Mayo High School for Math, Science, and Technology is a magnet high school located in Darlington, South Carolina. The school educates about 340 students in grades 9 to 12 in the Darlington County School District.

History
Mayo High School was built around 1950 as an African-American school. It was named for Dr. Amory Dwight Mayo, a minister and educator.

At the order of a judge to become desegregated, Mayo was renovated and became a magnet school in 1996. It was named for Dr. Dwight Mayo, an educator.

Mayo High School earned a silver medal in the U.S. News/School Matters Best High Schools rankings. Their most recent award is being recognized as a Palmetto's Finest School.

References 

Schools in Darlington County, South Carolina
Public high schools in South Carolina
Magnet schools in South Carolina
Darlington, South Carolina